La Grande Rivière Airport  is an airfield location about  south southwest of Radisson, Quebec, Canada. It is used mostly to shuttle Hydro-Québec personnel between Radisson and the larger cities in Quebec, but it is also served by regular scheduled flights of Air Inuit. Passengers from Nunavik region flying south to Montreal go through security at this airport instead of their origin airport.

Air Creebec also served the airport until March 2012.

During the mid- and late 1970s, Nordair operated scheduled passenger flights nonstop to Montreal Dorval Airport (now Trudeau International Airport) with Boeing 737-200 jetliners on a weekly basis.

Airlines and destinations

Accidents and incidents
On 15 November 1975, Douglas C-47 C-FCSC of Nordair was damaged beyond economic repair by fire at La Grande Rivière Airport.

On 1 August 1994, RAF Tornado GR1 ZD844 made an emergency landing at La Grande Rivière Airport.  The aircraft had just had a midair collision with another RAF Tornado, ZA397, which then crashed into a nearby reservoir after the crew ejected.

See also
 La Grande-3 Airport
 La Grande-4 Airport

References

External links

James Bay Project
Certified airports in Nord-du-Québec